JetBlue, stylized as jetBlue, is a United States low-cost airline headquartered in the Long Island City neighborhood of the New York City borough of Queens. It also maintains corporate offices in Utah and Florida.

JetBlue operates over 1,000 flights daily and serves 100 domestic and international network destinations in the United States, Canada, Mexico, the Caribbean, Central America, South America, and Europe. JetBlue is not a member of any of the three major airline alliances but it has codeshare agreements with 21 airlines, including member airlines of Oneworld, SkyTeam, and Star Alliance.

History

1998–2000 founding 
JetBlue was incorporated in Delaware in August 1998 with its headquarters in Forest Hills, Queens. David Neeleman founded the company in August 1999, under the name "NewAir". JetBlue started by following Southwest's approach of offering low-cost travel, but sought to distinguish itself by its amenities, such as in-flight entertainment, TV at every seat, and Sirius XM satellite radio. JetBlue sought to primarily use the Airbus A320 family to ease maintenance, a similar approach Southwest takes with the Boeing 737.

In September 1999, the airline was awarded 75 initial take-off/landing slots at John F. Kennedy International Airport and received its USDOT CPCN authorization in February 2000. It commenced operations on February 11, 2000, with services to Buffalo and Fort Lauderdale.

JetBlue's founders had set out to call the airline "Taxi" and therefore have a yellow livery to associate the airline with New York. The idea was dropped after threats from investor JP Morgan to pull its share ($40 million of the total $128 million) of the airline's initial funding unless the name was changed.

2000s 
JetBlue was one of only a few U.S. airlines that made a profit during the sharp downturn in airline travel following the September 11 attacks. The company's planned initial public offering was put on hold due to the attacks and subsequent downturn. The IPO took place in April 2002.

The airline sector responded to JetBlue and Southwest's market presence by starting mini-rival carriers: Delta Air Lines started Song and United Airlines launched another rival called Ted. Song has since been disbanded and was reabsorbed by Delta Air Lines and Ted reabsorbed by United.

In October 2005, JetBlue's quarterly profit had plunged from US$8.1 million to $2.7 million largely due to rising fuel costs. Operational issues, fuel prices, and low fares, JetBlue's hallmark, were bringing its financial performance down. In addition, with higher costs related to the airline's numerous amenities, JetBlue was becoming less competitive.

For many years, analysts had predicted that JetBlue's growth rate would become unsustainable. Despite this, the airline continued to add planes and routes to the fleet at a brisk pace. In addition in 2006, the IAM (International Association of Machinists) attempted to unionize JetBlue's "ramp service workers", in a move that was described by JetBlue's COO Dave Barger as "pretty hypocritical", as the IAM opposed JetBlue's creation when it was founded as New Air in 1998. The union organizing petition was dismissed by the National Mediation Board because fewer than 35 percent of eligible employees supported an election.

JetBlue experienced its first-ever quarterly loss during the fourth quarter of 2005 when the airline lost $42.4 million, enough to make them unprofitable for the entire year of 2005. The loss was the airline's first since going public in 2002. In addition to that, JetBlue forecasted a loss for 2006, citing high fuel prices, operating inefficiency, and fleet costs. During the first quarter report, CEO David Neeleman, President Dave Barger, and then-CFO John Owen released JetBlue's "Return to Profitability" ("RTP") plan, stating in detail how they would curtail costs and improve revenue to regain profitability. The plan called for $50 million in annual cost cuts and a push to boost revenue by $30 million. In October 2006, JetBlue announced a net loss of $500,000 for Quarter 3, and a plan to regain that loss by deferring some of their E190 deliveries and by selling five of their A320s.

In December 2006, JetBlue, as part of their RTP plan, removed a row of seats from their A320s to lighten the aircraft by 904 lb (410 kg) and reduce the cabin crew size from four to three (per FAA regulation requiring one flight attendant per 50 seats), thus offsetting the lost revenue from the removal of seats, and further lightening the aircraft, resulting in less fuel burned. In January 2007, JetBlue returned to profitability with a fourth quarter profit in 2006, reversing a quarterly loss in the year-earlier period. As part of the RTP plan, 2006's full-year loss was $1 million compared to 2005's full-year loss of $20 million. JetBlue was one of the few major airlines to post a profit in that quarter.

While its financial performance started showing signs of improvement, in February 2007, JetBlue faced a crisis, when the blizzard of 2007 hit the Northeast and Midwest, throwing the airline's operations into chaos. Because JetBlue followed the practice of never cancelling flights, it desisted from calling flights off, even when the ice storm hit and the airline was forced to keep several planes on the ground. Because of this, passengers were kept waiting at the airports for their flights to take off. In some cases, passengers who had already boarded their planes were kept waiting on the apron for several hours and were not allowed to disembark. However, after all this, the airline was eventually forced to cancel most of its flights because of prevailing weather conditions. This reportedly cost JetBlue $30 million.

Following the February 2007 incident in which the airline was forced to cancel nearly 1,700 flights due to winter storms, JetBlue's board of directors replaced founder and chief executive officer David Neeleman with Dave Barger. He had politicked the board, while Neeleman was busy publicly apologizing. Barger's ascendancy caused widespread demoralization in the ranks. He became JetBlue's new chief executive officer on May 10, 2007. Neeleman, the company's founder and largest individual investor, became a nonexecutive chairman as a result of the change.

In 2007, JetBlue was also facing reliability problems with its Embraer 190 fleet. For a couple of months, JetBlue contracted ExpressJet to operate four Embraer 145 regional jets on behalf of JetBlue. While this was going on, two E-190 aircraft at a time were sent to an Embraer maintenance facility in Nashville, Tennessee. ExpressJet operated routes between Boston Logan and Buffalo, New York, and Washington Dulles, and between New York–JFK and Columbus, Ohio (has terminated), and Richmond, Virginia.

In July 2007, the airline partnered with 20th Century Fox's film The Simpsons Movie to become the "Official Airline of Springfield". In addition a contest was held in which the grand prize would be a trip on JetBlue to Los Angeles to attend the premiere of the film. The airline's website was also redecorated with characters and their favorite JetBlue destinations and the company was taken over by the show/film's businessman villain Montgomery Burns.

In August 2007, the airline added exclusive content from The New York Times in the form of an in-flight video magazine, conducted by Times journalists and content from NYTimes.com.

On November 8, 2007, JetBlue appointed Ed Barnes as interim CFO, following the resignation of former CFO John Harvey.

On December 13, 2007, JetBlue and Germany-based Lufthansa announced JetBlue's intent to sell 19% of JetBlue to Lufthansa, pending approval from US regulators. Following the acquisition, Lufthansa stated they planned to seek operational cooperation with JetBlue. Lufthansa planned to offer connections to JetBlue flights in Boston, New York (JFK), and Orlando International Airport (no longer a connection). After making a codeshare agreement with Lufthansa that went into effect in 2010, JetBlue transitioned to the Sabre reservation system used by Lufthansa, enabling the airlines to sell tickets on each other's flights, transfer luggage and passengers between the two carriers, and combine frequent flyer programs. By making use of JetBlue's North America routes as a feeder network, the agreement put Lufthansa in a position to operate quasi-hubs in New York–JFK and Boston Logan.

In the March edition of Airways Magazine, it was announced that once JetBlue partnered with Yahoo! and with BlackBerry producer Research in Motion, that the airline would offer free, limited Wi-Fi capabilities on a single aircraft, N651JB, an Airbus A320-232 dubbed "BetaBlue". People could access e-mail with a Wi-Fi capable Blackberry, or use Yahoo!'s e-mail and instant messaging with a Wi-Fi capable laptop, while in flight over the US. LiveTV in Melbourne Florida, created and operated the "BetaBlue" prototype. The "BetaBlue" system utilized the bandwidth and infrastructure of defunct Airfone.

In 2008, JetBlue partnered with Irish flag carrier Aer Lingus to allow passengers to switch between airlines on a single ticket for flights with connections in either New York JFK or Boston. Unlike traditional codeshare agreements, the partnership did not allow the airlines to directly sell seats on each other's flights. Therefore, customers initiated the purchase on one airline's website, and then were transferred to the other airline's website to complete the transaction.

On March 19, 2008, JetBlue added Orlando, Florida, as a gateway focus city to international destinations in the Caribbean, Mexico, and South America. New international routes from Orlando International Airport include Cancún, Mexico; Bridgetown, Barbados; Bogotá, Colombia; Nassau, Bahamas; San José, Costa Rica; and Santo Domingo, Dominican Republic. In conjunction with the addition of new routes the airline continued significant expansion of operations at Orlando International Airport including a 292-room lodge that houses trainees attending the existing "JetBlue University" training facility, which opened in 2015.

On May 21, 2008, JetBlue named Joel Peterson chairman and Frank Sica vice chairman of its board of directors, replacing David Neeleman, who stepped down as CEO in 2007.

On August 4, 2008, the Associated Press reported that JetBlue would replace their recycled pillows and blankets with an "eco-friendly" pillow and blanket package that passengers would have to purchase for use. This decision was in a series of moves designed to increase revenue. JetBlue told the Associated Press that it expected to collect $40 million from passengers selecting seats with extra legroom and $20 million from passengers paying $15 to check a second bag. In September 2008, JetBlue began charging passengers $10–30 for an extended-leg-room seat depending on the length of the flight.

In September 2008, JetBlue began operating Republican vice presidential candidate Sarah Palin's campaign aircraft, an E190. 

On October 22, 2008, JetBlue opened its new primary hub at John F. Kennedy International Airport (JFK), Terminal 5, or simply T5, costing approximately $800 million to create. The first flight arrived from Bob Hope Airport (B6 #358) at 5:06am followed by arrivals from Oakland International Airport and Long Beach Airport, respectively. The new T5 would replace JetBlue current hub at JFK Terminal 6. The last flight to operate out of T6 was a departure to Rafael Hernández Airport in Aguadilla, Puerto Rico, departing at 11:59pm.

In 2009, JetBlue announced that it was looking for a new headquarters location, and was considering moving either within the New York City metropolitan area or to the Orlando, Florida, area. In April 2009, Helen Marshall, the president of the Borough of Queens, said that the City of New York was trying to keep JetBlue in the city.

On October 13, 2009, the airline unveiled a modification to its livery in commemoration of the upcoming tenth anniversary of the airline in February 2010. Besides a new tail design, the revised livery includes larger "billboard" titles extending down over the passenger windows at the front of the aircraft. The logo word 'jetBlue' was no longer silver and blue but a dark, navy blue.

2010s 

In 2010, JetBlue entered into interline booking agreements with South African Airways and American Airlines to facilitate luggage transfers between airlines for passengers with connecting flights on a different carrier. The agreement with American included JetBlue's 18 destinations not served by American and American's 12 international flights out of New York–JFK and Boston Logan. In addition, American gave JetBlue 8 round trips slots out of Washington National in D.C. and 2 out of Westchester, New York. In return, JetBlue gave American 6 round trips out of New York–JFK. The agreement with American Airlines has since ended according to JetBlue's website.

In January 2010, the CEO of JetBlue, Dave Barger, and Governor of Florida Charlie Crist met in Tallahassee, Florida, to discuss a possible move of the airlines headquarters to Orlando. On March 22, 2010, JetBlue announced it headquarters would remain in the New York City area, in Long Island City, because of the airline's historical links to the city, the cost of staff relocations, the airline's desire to retain access to financial markets, and because Aer Lingus and Lufthansa, JetBlue's marketing partners, fly into JFK Airport. On March 22, 2010, JetBlue turned down incentives from the City of Orlando and announced its headquarters would keep its Forest Hills office, start leasing and using a new office in the Brewster Building in Long Island City, New York. in Queens Plaza in Long Island City, move its headquarters there in mid-2012, and start a joint branding deal with New York State using the iconic I Love NY logo.

On October 18, 2011, CFO Ed Barnes resigned, effective immediately. The company's treasurer, Mark Powers, was appointed interim CFO until a replacement for Barnes could be found.

In 2011, JetBlue made interline agreements with Virgin Atlantic and Jet Airways, both of which have since been terminated.

On June 13, 2012, JetBlue ranked 'Highest in Customer Satisfaction Among Low Cost Carriers in North America' by J.D. Power and Associates for the eighth year in a row.

In October 2013, JetBlue introduced Mint, a premium cabin service on transcontinental and select Caribbean flights. The service began in 2014, using the Airbus A321-231 aircraft ordered by JetBlue. These planes are outfitted with winglets, as well as with "lie flat" seats, and moveable partitions that can create small suites on the airplane. Called "Mint" by JetBlue, these planes are configured with 16 business-class seats and 143 economy seats, instead of an all-economy configuration of 190 seats.

On April 22, 2014, JetBlue's pilots voted to unionize for the first time since the airline was founded, with 71% casting ballots in favor of joining the ALPA.

On September 18, 2014, Dave Barger announced his resignation from the company effective February 16, 2015, following several reports that investors and the board were unhappy with his performance. He was replaced on the board and as CEO by Robin Hayes.

During the last few days of June and the first few days of July 2015, JetBlue began charging for bags in certain booking classes, leaving Southwest Airlines the only major U.S. carrier to not charge for bags. For the classes in which bag check fees were charged (generally the lowest class of fares offered; JetBlue offered three classes of fares), the cost was $20 for the first bag and $35 for the second, which was the lowest in the United States besides Frontier Airlines with similar prices.

On May 6, 2015, JetBlue was one of the first airlines to be granted a license to commence charter flights to Cuba, with flights departing from New York City. The weekly charter service began on July 3, 2015, with 150-seat Airbus A320s.

In July 2016, JetBlue announced commercial flights from the United States to Cuba would commence in late August. On August 31, 2016, JetBlue Flight 387 from Fort Lauderdale–Hollywood International Airport to Abel Santamaría Airport, in Santa Clara, became the first scheduled commercial flight between the United States and Cuba in 55 years. Only charter flights were allowed under previous rules, which required that passengers had to arrive more than four hours before the scheduled departure and often endure long lines for documentation checks, late flight arrivals, and pay high baggage fees.

In 2016, JetBlue had bid for but was unsuccessful in acquiring Virgin America, which was instead acquired by Alaska Air Group.

In November 2016, JetBlue painted one of their Airbus A320 aircraft, N763JB, in a 1960s retrojet livery, dubbed "What's Old is Blue Again". The livery's maiden flight was on Friday, from New York JFK to Palm Springs.

In July 2017, JetBlue announced it was taking qualifications to develop a terminal at JFK that would not only occupy terminal 5 but also the space of terminals 6 and 7.

In April 2018, JetBlue announced their return to Ontario International Airport in southern California after ten years, as well as new service to Steamboat Springs in Colorado, and Bozeman in Montana.

In April 2019, JetBlue announced that it would launch transatlantic flights to London from Boston and New York. The airline added that it would be converting 13 orders for the A321neo into the longer range Airbus A321LR to serve the new routes.

On May 1, 2019, JetBlue named Michael Stromer Chief Product Officer, Technology. Mr. Stromer was selected to lead the design and execution of the digital commerce web and mobile applications that support revenue initiatives; technology for airport, customer support (reservations), system operations, technical operations, flight, and inflight teams, as well as back office products.

On May 29, 2019, JetBlue and Southwest Airlines ranked 'Highest in Customer Satisfaction Among Low Cost Carriers' in a tie by J.D. Power in the North America Airline Satisfaction Study.

On October 18, 2019, JetBlue and Norwegian Air Shuttle announced plans for an interline agreement that would permit sales of jointly-issued tickets, which if approved between the two airlines, would come into effect during 2020. The partnership was to take advantage of each airline having substantial pre-existing presence at New York–JFK, Boston, and Fort Lauderdale airports.

2020s 
In January 2020, JetBlue announced its intentions to start becoming carbon neutral on all domestic flights. In February 2020, Joel Peterson announced his intention to retire from the airline's board of directors at the end of his current term, and was subsequently succeeded by Peter Boneparth in May 2020. Peterson had been part of the airline's board of directors since 1999 and served as chairman since 2008.

JetBlue made changes to its operations due to the COVID-19 pandemic and its associated impacts on aviation. This included the reduction of passenger capacity by blocking middle seats on its Airbus A320 and A321 aircraft, and aisle seats on the Embraer E190. As a result of the economic effects caused by the pandemic, the company launched voluntary separation and extended time off programs. By August 2020, JetBlue, along with Southwest Airlines implemented strict policies for the wearing of facial masks, the policies of which would additionally not allow for "medical exemptions", as part of their procedures during the COVID-19 pandemic. The airline also announced that it would also continue to block middle seats through at least mid-October.

In June 2020, the airline announced several new routes across its network, including point-to-point routes between the northeastern United States and Florida, and new transcontinental routes from Newark Liberty International Airport. Along with the impact of the COVID-19 pandemic on aviation, the airline announced that over 60% of its employees were interested in taking early retirement or long-term leave from the firm. In July 2020, American Airlines joined the airline in a strategic partnership, which would allow both airlines' expansions to destinations, customer connectivity, and support of expansions through the airline's loyalty program. The Northeast Alliance, as the deal was called, included coordinating direct flights for Boston and New York City. Along with its announcement of its strategic partnership with American Airlines, the airline announced the imminent closure of its base at Long Beach Airport and transfer of the base's operations to Los Angeles International Airport from October 6, 2020.

On February 1, 2021, JetBlue introduced its new Mint product called Mint Suite, which was to be configured on its entire Airbus A321LR fleet for its future transatlantic flights to London, and on some of its A321neo aircraft for select flights initially to Los Angeles. On April 21, 2021, JetBlue announced that the airline would be expanding into Canada, announcing new routes between Vancouver and both New York City and Boston. On April 26, 2021, JetBlue held its inaugural Airbus A220-300 flight which flew from Boston Logan International Airport to Tampa International Airport. On May 19, 2021, JetBlue confirmed the start dates and destination airports for its planned flights to London, and by extension its first flights to Europe. The airline announced that it would operate services from New York JFK to both London Heathrow and Gatwick airports, and that the services would launch on August 11, 2021, and September 29, 2021, respectively. In turn, the airline's planned flights between London and Boston were postponed to 2022.

In May 2022, JetBlue's offer for Spirit Airlines, made in response to an offer from Frontier, was rejected, citing an "‘an unacceptable level of closing risk’ even with an enhanced offer. Later that month, JetBlue announced its intentions to execute a hostile takeover of Spirit.

On July 28, JetBlue announced it had reached an agreement to purchase Spirit Airlines for $3.8 billion. The United States Justice Department has sought to block the deal, taking JetBlue to court over the sale. In the filing, the Justice Department claims that the merger will result in "higher fares, fewer seats, and harm millions of consumers".

In September 2022, JetBlue's venture subsidiary relaunched with a new name: JetBlue Ventures.

In November 2022, JetBlue confirmed plans to fly from New York JFK to Paris Charles de Gaulle starting in summer 2023. It said it then plans to add service from Boston Logan International after.

Corporate affairs

Headquarters and offices 

JetBlue's headquarters are in the Brewster Building in Long Island City, New York. JetBlue previously had its headquarters at 80–02 Kew Gardens Road, and then in the Forest Hills Tower, both in Forest Hills, Queens, New York City,  from the current office in Long Island City.

JetBlue also maintains field offices in Salt Lake City and in Orlando (which is on the property of Orlando International Airport and occupies the airline's training academy).

Leadership 
JetBlue's current leadership team is as follows:
 Chairman: Peter Boneparth (since May 2020)
 Chief Executive Officer: Robin Hayes (since February 2015)

Former chairmen 

 David Neeleman (1998–2008)
 Joel Peterson (2008–2020)

Former chief executives 

 David Neeleman (1998–2007)
 David Barger (2007–2015)

Business model 
JetBlue operates with most of the features of a low-cost carrier (LCC), for example (and as referred to in their Annual Report), a fleet of new and efficient aircraft of (mainly) one model, high aircraft utilization, point-to-point routes (with several aircraft bases), relatively low distribution costs, and without membership of a major airline alliance.

However, in JetBlue's business model, the airline offers more than one class of cabin, provides free in-flight entertainment and refreshments, and maintains codeshare agreements with several other airlines.

Marketing strategy 
JetBlue's first major advertising campaign incorporated phrases like "Unbelievable" and "We like you, too". Full-page newspaper advertisements boasted low fares, new aircraft, leather seats, spacious legroom, and a customer-service-oriented staff committed to "bringing humanity back to air travel".  JetBlue became the first airline to offer all passengers personalized in-flight entertainment. In April 2000, flat-screen monitors installed in every seatback allowed customers live access to over 20 DirecTV channels at no additional cost.

As JetBlue gained market share, they found a position where they competed with other low-cost carriers as well as major carriers. Amenities such as their live in-flight television, free and unlimited snack offerings, comfortable legroom, and unique promotions fostered an image of impeccable customer service that rivaled the major airlines, while competitive low fares made them a threat to low-cost no-frills carriers as well.

Subsidiaries and investments

JetBlue Ventures 

JetBlue Ventures is the airlines venture capital subsidiary. It was established in February 2016 as JetBlue Technology Ventures (JTV). The subsidiary's primary objective is to invests in and partners with early-stage startups in the travel, hospitality, and transportation space with a mission is to improve the end-to-end experience of travelers everywhere.

, JTV has invested in 21 startups, including hybrid planes, machine learning algorithms, and ground transportation. Investments range in size from $250,000 to $1 million. JetBlue Technology Ventures, along with Toyota Ventures and Parley for the Oceans, is among the corporate investors that have invested $40 million in the Air Company, a carbon negative vodka distiller and perfume and hand sanitizer manufacturer that uses heterogeneous catalysis to convert captured carbon into ethanol.

JetBlue Travel Products 

JetBlue Travel Products, a subsidiary created in 2018, consists of the JetBlue Vacations brand and other non-air travel products including travel insurance, cruises, car rentals and more. In May 2018, JetBlue Travel Products moved to Florida, with JetBlue Vacations as its top travel product.

LiveTV 

LiveTV was a wholly owned subsidiary of JetBlue since 2002. The LiveTV subsidiary provided seat back entertainment systems with Live Satellite Television and Live Satellite Radio to airlines including JetBlue. The subsidiary was sold to Thales for nearly $400 million in June 2014.

JSX 

On October 25, 2016, the airline JSX (then branded as JetSuiteX) announced that JetBlue had made a minority equity investment in the airline. Part of the agreement also gave JetBlue a seat on JetSuite's board of directors. Reasons for the investment was outlined by CEO Robin Hayes, stating, "Our investment in JetSuite makes sense as we continue to execute on our west coast plan and invest in innovative ideas that reflect the disruptive spirit of JetBlue." In JetBlue's first quarter 2018 investor call, JetBlue's CFO Steven Priest confirmed the airline held about 10% of JetSuiteX. The airline was rebranded from JetSuiteX to JSX in August 2019.

TWA Flight Center Hotel 

The TWA Hotel is the TWA Flight Center structure at JFK airport that was rebuilt into 505-room hotel. The hotel preserves the Eero Saarinen TWA head house while replacing the structures on either side of the head house. Situated in front of JetBlue's JFK terminal, JetBlue has 5–10% ownership of the hotel. The hotel is an effective replacement for the Ramada Plaza JFK Hotel on the north end of the airport grounds in Building 144, which closed in 2009.

Universal Hydrogen 
In 2021, JetBlue became the first airline to invest in practical hydrogen-powered flight through its partnership with Universal Hydrogen, a company working on retrofitting current aircraft with tools to allow them to fly on hydrogen power. The company focuses on distributing fuel through modular capsules transported on the existing intermodal freight network, offsetting the need to retrofit airports with their own hydrogen fuel farms. JetBlue's initial investment helped Universal Hydrogen accelerate development and production of its regional aircraft conversion kits.

Universal Hydrogen began its initial rounds of testing in 2022 with an ATR-72.

Spirit Airlines 

In May 2022, JetBlue's offer for Spirit Airlines, made in response to an offer from Frontier, was rejected, citing an "‘an unacceptable level of closing risk’ even with an enhanced offer. Later that month, JetBlue announced its intentions to execute a hostile takeover of Spirit. The company followed through on this announcement by offering $30 per share in an all-cash, fully-financed deal, lower than the original $33 per share offer, although the earlier offer would still be on the table if Spirit were to negotiate. JetBlue's bid was initially rejected by Spirit's board, but on July 27, 2022, Spirit announced that its shareholders would reject Frontier's offer in favor of a deal with JetBlue.

On July 28, JetBlue announced it had reached an agreement to purchase Spirit Airlines for $3.8 billion.

Destinations 

, JetBlue Airways flies to 104 destinations in the Americas, with most of them in the United States and the Caribbean, a smaller selection of destinations in parts of Central and South America, and two destinations in Europe.

Codeshare agreements 
JetBlue has entered into a number of codeshare agreements with other airlines, meaning airlines agree to share certain flights, which both airlines market and publish on their own flight schedules under their respective airline designators and flight numbers.

JetBlue codeshares with the following airlines:

 Aer Lingus
 American Airlines
 Azul Brazilian Airlines
 Cape Air
 El Al
 Etihad Airways
 JSX
 Hawaiian Airlines
 Icelandair
 LOT Polish Airlines
 Porter Airlines
 Seaborne Airlines
 Silver Airways
 South African Airways
 Qatar Airways
 Royal Air Maroc
 Turkish Airlines

Fleet 

, JetBlue operates the following aircraft:

Fleet development 
Since 2011 JetBlue has made multiple order and order differentials. At first the airline intended to revamp it fleet with the introduction of 40 Airbus A320neo. The airline has made multiple changes to its order books with ordering multiple Airbus A321 aircraft and later converting almost all of its A320neo orders for the Airbus A321neo.

From 2018 and 2019 the airline made multiple changes to its fleet plans, with the airline intending to replace all of its aging Embraer E190 aircraft with the Airbus A220-300. And later modifying its Airbus A321neo orders to introduce the Airbus A321XLR aircraft to its fleet.

In 2020, JetBlue welcomed its first Airbus A220, and in 2021, the A321LR was added to the fleet. The airline expects to welcome the Airbus A321XLR aircraft to its fleet in 2024. JetBlue is also expected to take possession of aircraft belonging to Spirit Airlines following their planned merger.

Services

Seating 
On most of its aircraft, JetBlue offers a single cabin experience called Core. However, the airline differentiates a select number of rows with 7 extra inches of legroom, referred to as Even More Space seats. The Core cabin includes leather seats, complimentary Wi-Fi, complimentary entertainment screens with DirecTV, Sirius XM Radio, and movies, as well as complimentary snacks and non-alcoholic drinks.

The airline revamped the Core seats in 2014 with the launch of the Airbus A321. The revamped Core seats started to appear on the airline's A320 aircraft in 2018, with further modifications in 2019. This seat design carried over to JetBlue's Airbus A220 aircraft upon launch.

JetBlue's E190s are not expected to undergo retrofitting due to the airline's plan to phase the aircraft out of service by 2026.

Mint 
In 2014, the airline introduced its version of a business class cabin, called Mint. The service was originally available only on transcontinental domestic routes on select Airbus A321s starting in 2014. The seat design includes fully lie-flat seats, some of which have sliding panels for more privacy.

Mint was later expanded to select Caribbean routes, and in 2021, an upgraded version of the service and seating was announced.

In-flight entertainment 
JetBlue's in-flight entertainment options consist of gate-to-gate Fly-Fi internet access, over 100 channels of DIRECTV, Sirius XM Radio, and movies, and on the Airbus A321 and newer retrofitted Airbus A320 aircraft, a 15-inch interactive video screen which is not available on the rest of the fleet. JetBlue's partnership with Amazon lets customers watch Amazon Prime videos by connecting to Wi-Fi and downloading the Amazon Video app on their mobile phone or tablet.

The in-flight WiFi under the "Fly-Fi" network is complimentary on all flights, at speeds of 12–15 megabits per second.

Frequent-flyer program 

JetBlue's frequent-flyer program is called TrueBlue. Under the original TrueBlue program, flights were worth two, four, or six points based on distance of the flights, and double points were awarded for flights booked online.

In September 2009, JetBlue made changes to its TrueBlue program. In the new program, members receive three points for every dollar spent toward a flight, excluding taxes and fees, plus an additional three points for every dollar spent on a flight if booked online directly on the JetBlue.com website. Additional points are awarded if the member uses the Barclay's issued JetBlue Mastercard credit card to purchase the flight. The price of flights in points depend on the fare of the flight in U.S. dollars. The new program launched on November 9, 2009.

In June 2013, JetBlue announced that TrueBlue points will never expire for any reason.

Accidents and incidents 

 September 21, 2005: Flight 292 en route from Bob Hope Airport in Burbank to New York JFK performed an emergency landing at Los Angeles International Airport (pictured) following a failure of the nose landing gear during retraction when it turned 90 degrees. The plane landed after holding for about three hours to burn fuel and therefore lighten the aircraft. The aircraft came to a stop without incident on runway 25L, the second-longest runway at LAX. The only apparent damage to the plane upon landing was the destruction of the front wheels, which were ground down to almost semicircles, and the tires; the front landing strut held. No one sustained injuries.
 March 27, 2012: Flight 191 en route from New York JFK to McCarran International Airport in Las Vegas performed an emergency landing at Rick Husband Amarillo International Airport after the captain, Clayton Osbon, was locked out of the cockpit and subdued by passengers after he started acting erratically and ranting about terrorists. It is believed that Osbon suffered from an unspecified mental breakdown, and was treated by Northwest Texas Healthcare System. There were no fatalities. This happened three years before Germanwings Flight 9525.
 August 9, 2014: Flight 704 from  Luis Muñoz Marín International Airport in San Juan to New York JFK aborted takeoff after one of the engines caught fire. All 186 passengers were evacuated from the aircraft. Two women received minor injuries during the evacuation.
 March 25, 2016: Flight 29 from Washington National Airport was on approach to Lynden Pindling International Airport in Nassau, Bahamas when the crew did not receive a nose gear down and locked indication.  The pilots conducted a go-around in order to attempt to lower the gear.  As the crew were unable to extend the gear, the plane performed a nose gear up landing on Runway 14.  There were no injuries, and passengers disembarked onto the runway and were bussed to the terminal. 
 October 20, 2020: On a JetBlue flight from Norman Manley International Airport to JFK, a man wearing a Burger King crown named Ryan Brewer was handcuffed and escorted off the plane after screaming curse words and racial slurs and arguing with a flight attendant, claiming that a woman stole his seat and kneed him in the stomach. The flight was delayed by over an hour as a result. A JetBlue spokesperson declared in a statement that the airline has “zero tolerance for racism or harassment”, and the man was stripped of his flight privileges with the airline.
 September 23, 2021: On a flight to San Juan Airport, a man attempted to enter the cockpit and choked a flight attendant. Some crew members were able to restrain him until the flight landed.
 January 22, 2022: Flight 1748 from Yampa Valley Airport in Hayden, Colorado to Fort Lauderdale International Airport in Florida experienced a tail strike during takeoff from runway 10, in an attempt to avoid a collision with a Beechcraft Super King Air 350 that was on approach to the opposite runway. The aircraft diverted to Denver International Airport and landed safely.
 April 20, 2022: An altercation took place on a flight from San Francisco International Airport to Fort Lauderdale International Airport between boxer Mike Tyson and another passenger resulting in Tyson punching the passenger involved.

See also 
 Air transportation in the United States
 Spirit Airlines

References

Further reading 
 Blue Streak by Barbara S. Peterson, Portfolio, 2004
 Flying High by James Wynbrandt, John Wiley & Sons Inc., 2004

External links 

 

 
Airlines established in 1998
Airlines for America members
Companies based in Queens, New York
Companies listed on the Nasdaq
Companies in the Dow Jones Transportation Average
Low-cost carriers
Publicly traded companies based in New York City
Airlines based in New York (state)
American companies established in 1998